Lists of Nigerian state governors cover the governors of states of Nigeria. The governor heads the executive branch of the state government, and can appoint people to the State Executive Council subject to the advice and consent of the State House of Assembly (Legislature). The lists include a list of current governors, lists by state, lists by period and a list of governors of former states.

Current governors
 List of state governors of Nigeria

By state

 List of governors of Abia State
 List of governors of Adamawa State
 List of governors of Akwa Ibom State
 List of governors of Anambra State
 List of governors of Bauchi State
 List of governors of Bayelsa State
 List of governors of Bendel State
 List of governors of Benue State
 List of governors of Borno State
 List of governors of Cross River State
 List of governors of Delta State
 List of governors of Eastern Region, Nigeria
 List of governors of Ebonyi State
 List of governors of Edo State
 List of governors of Ekiti State
 List of governors of Enugu State
 List of governors of Gombe State
 List of governors of Gongola State
 List of governors of Imo State
 List of governors of Jigawa State
 List of governors of Kaduna State
 List of governors of Kano State
 List of governors of Katsina State
 List of governors of Kebbi State
 List of governors of Kogi State
 List of governors of Kwara State
 List of governors of Lagos State
 List of governors of Nasarawa State
 List of governors of Niger State
 List of governors of Ogun State
 List of governors of Ondo State
 List of governors of Osun State
 List of governors of Oyo State
 List of governors of Plateau State
 List of governors of Rivers State
 List of governors of Sokoto State
 List of governors of Taraba State
 List of governors of Western State
 List of governors of Yobe State
 List of governors of Zamfara State

By period
 List of governors and governors-general of Nigeria (1914–1963, United Kingdom)
 Nigerian region governors and premiers in the First Republic (1960–1966)
 Military Governors in Nigeria during the Yakubu Gowon regime (1967–1975)
 Military Governors in Nigeria during the Murtala Muhammed regime (1975–1976)
 Military Governors in Nigeria during the Olusegun Obasanjo regime (1976–1979)
 State governors in the Nigerian Second Republic (1979–83)
 State Governors in the Nigerian Third Republic (1992–1993)
 Nigerian state governors 1999–2003 term
 Nigerian state governors 2003–07 term
 Nigerian state governors 2007–11 term
 Nigerian state governors 2011–15 term

Other
 List of governors of former Nigerian states